Jahn's tree frog (Hyloscirtus jahni) is a species of frogs in the family Hylidae endemic to Venezuela. Its natural habitats are subtropical or tropical moist montane forests and rivers. It is threatened by habitat loss.

Sources

Hyloscirtus
Amphibians of the Andes
Amphibians described in 1961
Taxonomy articles created by Polbot